North Carolina Highway 88 (NC 88) is a  primary state highway in the U.S. state of North Carolina.  Primarily in the High Country, it runs from the Tennessee state line near Trade east to NC 18 in Laurel Springs.

Route description
NC 88 starts at the terminus of Tennessee State Route 67 at the Tennessee state line (at a location called State Line Gap), just  from U.S. Route 421 (US 421).  The road follows the Hoskin Fork through its brief stay in Watauga County into Ashe County where it meets up with the North Fork New River at Sutherland Road.  Until Warrensville, the highway is constantly curving along the banks of the Hoskin Fork and North Fork New River, though there is not much elevation change.

From Warrensville, the highway goes southeast through the community of Smethport and into town of Jefferson. Going through the downtown area, it connects with US 221 and then NC 16 east of town. Continuing southeast, it passes the South Fork New River then going east to Laurel Springs in Alleghany County where it ends at a Y-intersection with NC 18 (in front of the U.S. Post Office of Laurel Springs). The second half of NC 88, from Jefferson to Laurel Springs, is less curvy compared to the first half and functions as an alternative to US 221 towards Galax, Virginia.

Scenic byways
The New River Valley Byway is a  byway, split in two sections.  NC 88 makes up the second section  of the byway, between Jefferson and Laurel Springs.  It is noted for several of the state parks that surround the route and the community of Ore Knob, charted in 1875 and named from the only copper mine that existed in North Carolina.  The first section is on NC 194, between Boone and Baldwin.

History
NC 88 was established in 1938 as a new primary route between NC 16 to NC 18 in Laurel Springs.  The highway was extended in 1940 replacing NC 16 west of Jefferson to the Tennessee state line. The route has not changed since.

Major intersections

References

088
Transportation in Watauga County, North Carolina
Transportation in Ashe County, North Carolina
Transportation in Alleghany County, North Carolina